The Royal United Services Institute  (RUSI, Rusi), registered as Royal United Service Institute for Defence and Security Studies and formerly the Royal United Services Institute for Defence Studies, is a British defence and security think tank. It was founded in 1831 by the Duke of Wellington, Sir Arthur Wellesley.

The current President of RUSI is the Duke of Kent and its Director-General is Karin von Hippel.

History 
RUSI was founded in 1831 – making it the oldest defence and security think tank in the world – at the initiative of the Duke of Wellington. Its original mission was to study naval and military science.

The Duke of Wellington spearheaded the establishment of RUSI in a letter to Colbourn's United Service Journal arguing that "a United Service Museum" should be formed, managed entirely by naval and military officers, and under patronage of the monarch, then King George IV, and the commanders-in-chief of the armed forces. Such an institution would prove that the two professions have entered the lists of science, and are ready to contend for honours tam Artibus quam Armis – 'as much through the arts as through weapons'.

Subsequently, Commander Henry Downes, Royal Navy, assembled a group with a view to forming a committee for action, to which King George's First ADC was commanded to convey "His Majesty's gracious and high approbation of the undertaking and of the principles on which it is proposed to conduct it", which were stated to be suitable for "a strictly scientific and professional society, and not a club". The death of the King delayed matters, but the Duke of Clarence expressed his readiness to become a patron so, encouraged by the powerful support of the Duke of Wellington, the First Aide-de-camp, Sir Herbert Taylor, re-submitted the project to William IV (the former Duke of Clarence), and was able to assure the committee that "it could proceed under his Majesty's gracious auspices".

On 25 June 1831 the committee met. The chair was taken by Major General Sir Howard Douglas, in his person a symbol of the "United Service": a soldier who was the leading expert on naval gunnery. The resolution that the institution be established was put by the future Field Marshal Viscount Hardinge and seconded by the future Rear-Admiral Sir Francis Beaufort, the famous hydrographer. The first name adopted was the Naval and Military Museum: this was altered in 1839 to the United Service Institution, and in 1860 to the Royal United Service Institution by a royal charter of incorporation. In 2004 the name was changed to the Royal United Services Institute for Defence and Security Studies. Fellows of RUSI may use the five-letter post-nominal abbreviation, FRUSI.

Premises
Prior to moving into its current purpose-built headquarters in 1895, RUSI began its existence in Whitehall Court, then moved to a house in what was then known as Middle Scotland Yard in 1832. Queen Victoria granted RUSI the use of the Banqueting House, in Whitehall, Westminster. It finally moved to its current location next door to the Banqueting House in 1895.

Activities 

RUSI is a British institution; however, it operates with an international perspective. It promotes the study and discussion of developments in military doctrine, defence management and defence procurement. In the 21st century RUSI has broadened its remit to include all issues of defence and security, including financial and organised crime, terrorism and the ideologies which foster it and the challenges from other man-made or man-assisted threats and from natural disasters.

RUSI has a membership consisting of military officers, diplomats and the wider policy community, numbering 1,668 individuals and 129 corporate members (see the last page of the latest Review).

RUSI members and the wider defence and security community have access to the following activities:

Research 
According to its website, RUSI "maintains a wide range of multidisciplinary research specialisms. It focuses on the areas of Military Sciences, International Security Studies, Terrorism and Conflict, Cyber, Nuclear Proliferation, Financial Crime and Organised Crime". In April 2020, RUSI released a report urging the UK's intelligence agencies to step up their use of artificial intelligence in order to “keep pace” with adversaries who seek to exploit new technologies to attack Britain.

Analysis 

RUSI experts are often called upon to provide analysis and commentary on the leading defence and security issues of the day. In addition, RUSI.org hosts timely analysis on the defence and security issues of the day. Content is drawn from its publications and briefings from its researchers.

Events 
RUSI organises a number of lectures, seminars and conferences for its membership and the wider defence and international security community. Its location in Whitehall means that is able to attract leading statesmen and policymakers.

Publications 
RUSI publishes a number of periodicals and books. Its flagship publication is the RUSI Journal.

Recognition 
In 2008 and 2020, RUSI was named Think Tank of the Year by Prospect magazine.

In 2008 and 2011 the magazine named RUSI "Foreign Policy Think Tank of the Year", and in 2018, RUSI was short-listed in the Economic and Financial as well as the International Affairs categories.

Governance
RUSI gets its funding from individual members as well as corporate members, which includes major corporations from numerous countries. RUSI is governed by a council comprising vice-presidents, trustees and an advisory Council. Members serve for a three-year term.

 President Field Marshal the Duke of Kent
 Chairman Sir David Lidington

 Senior Vice President General David Petraeus, US Army. Rtd.
 Vice Chairman Sir John Scarlett

 Director-General Karin von Hippel
 Deputy Director-General Professor Malcolm Chalmers

See also
 List of UK think tanks

References

External links
 

1831 establishments in the United Kingdom
Foreign policy and strategy think tanks based in the United Kingdom
Grade II* listed buildings in the City of Westminster
International security
Military education and training in the United Kingdom
Organisations based in London
Organizations established in 1831
Political and economic think tanks based in the United Kingdom
Security studies
Think tanks based in the United Kingdom